Chakkappazham is a Malayalam language sitcom directed by R. Unnikrishnan that has been airing on Flowers TV from 10 August 2020. The sitcom recounted the happenings in the family of Uthaman and his wife Asha. They are played by SP Sreekumar and Aswathy Sreekanth.

S. P. Sreekumar, Aswathy Sreekanth, Muhammad Rafi, Haritha Haridas, Shruthi Rajanikanth, Vishnu IP, Manu Joseph, Amal Rajdev, and Sabitta George rounded up the Supporting Cast. The first season of the show aired from 10 August 2020 and ended on 21 June 2022 consisting of 440 episodes. The  second season of the show began broadcast on 29 August 2022.

Series overview

Plot summary 
Season 1 can be divided into 3 parts

Season 1 (Part 1) 
The family life of Uthaman and his wife Asha faces a series of misunderstandings and chaos. There is confusion, humor, healthy discussions and a lot of love. The main draw of the story is the interesting fights and situational comedy between family members.

Season 1 (Part 2) 
The story revolves around Sumesh (Muhammad Rafi) and Supriya (Haritha Haridas), who are newlyweds.

Season 1 (Part 3) 
The story revolves around Sumesh's uncle Shankunni and his family and their neighbour Prabhu and his family.

Season 2
The familial life of Uthaman, a compounder working at a veterinary hospital and his housemaker Asha is returned confront with a series of misunderstandings and chaos.

Cast

Main Cast (Season 2) 
 S. P. Sreekumar as Uthaman Kunjunni
 Aswathy Sreekanth as Asha Uthaman
 Muhammad Rafi as Sumesh Kunjunni
 Shruthi Rajanikanth as Painkilli/Pinky Kunjunni
 Arjun Somashekaran as PC Shivan
 Amal Rajdev as Plavilaveetil Kunjunni
 Sabitta George as Lalitha Kunjunni (Ep 1-Ep 57)
 Lakshmi Unnikrishnan as Pallavi Uthaman
 Aryan Kaashi as Shambu Uthaman
 Sadhika Suresh Menon as Aamy Uthaman
 Raihu Shameer as Kannan Shivan
 Indira Devi as Achamma / Meenakshiyamma

Recurring (Season 2) 
 Ananthan as Hrishikesh ; Asha's father
 Shonima as Shonima, Subhadra Kunjamma’s daughter, Kunjunni’s cousin
 Ajeesh as Ajeesh, Shonima’s husband
 Sheethal Elzha as Shobana aka Shilpa, the prankster hired by Painkili
 Mithun M. Das as Raghu Kumar, Asha’s stalker

Main (Season 1; Part 2) 
 Muhammad Rafi as Sumesh Kunjunni
 Haritha Haridas as Supriya Sumesh
 Shruthi Rajinikanth as Painkilli
 Vishnu IP as Shivan
 Amal Rajdev as Plavilla Veetil Kunjunni
 Sabitta George as Lalitha Kunjunni
 Manu Joseph as Shibu
 Lakshmi Unnikrishnan as Pallavi
 Aaryan Kashi as Shambu
 Sadhika Suresh Menon as Aami
 Indira Devi as Achamma

Recurring (Season 1; Part 1 & 2) 
 Kalabhavan Rahman as Marthandan Kunju
 Ananthan as Hrishikesh
 Shanmughan Das as Vijayan Shankunni
 Reshmi Anil as Kasthuri
 Shaju Mavelikara as Chori Babu
 Kavitha as Kanyaka
 Soundarya Suresh as Lilly

Main (Season 1; Part 3) 

 Muhammad Rafi as Sumesh Kunjunni
 Haritha Haridas as Supriya Sumesh
 Pradeep Menon as Dasan Shankunni
 Asha Aravind as Prathiba Dasan
 Abhilash Kottarakkara as Prabhu Pankajakshan
 Rohini Rahul as Manjusha Prabhu
 Sanoop Kumar as Killadi Raju
 Jerry Francis as Manikandan
 Aaryan Kaashi as Shambu Uthaman
 Ardhra Sajan as Madhu Prabhu
 Muhammad Faizal as Chikku Dasan
 Dhaya Bipin as Lakshmana Dasan
 Gopika Babu as Kallu Prabhu
 Tanmay Madhav as Bose Prabhu
 Lechu Lakshmi as Kunji Dasan

Former (Season 1)
 S. P. Sreekumar as Uthaman Kunjunni
 Aswathy Sreekanth as Asha Kunjunni
 Arjun Somashekaran as PC Shivan
 K. P. A. C. Lalitha as Kamala Kunjamma(Ep 101-Ep 110)

Reboot & Season 2 
The show's first season, which portrayed the life of Sumesh and his family ended on 16 May 2022. On the very next day, The show started portraying the life of Sumesh's uncle Shankunni and his family, which started with the same title.

Due to low trp and negative reviews the story of Sumesh's uncle and his family was concluded on 22 June 2022.

However, The story of Sumesh and his family returned to limelight on 29 August 2022 as the second season of Chakkappazham.

Reception 
The Show is one of the most popular television Sitcoms in Malayalam Television. It is widely praised for the chemistry among actors and for timely comedies. 

Muhammad Rafi, who plays a major role in this sitcom became popular due to his witty comic timing and method acting after the show started airing. He is also regarded as the most fan-based actor in Chakkappazham.

Awards

References

External links 
 

Malayalam-language television shows
Flowers (TV channel) original programming